Johanna Rosine Snoek, known as Hans Snoek, (December 29, 1910 – September 27, 2001) was a Dutch dancer, choreographer and ballet director.

The daughter of Leonard Salomon Snoek and Henderika Gerarda Trina Johanna ten Bruggencate, Snoek was born in Geertruidenberg. She studied dance with Kurt Jooss and Sigurd Leeder. During World War II, she staged performances in secret in support of the Dutch resistance.

She founded the Scapino Ballet in 1945 and the affiliated school Scapino Dansschool in 1951. The school later merged with Balletstudio Nel Roos to form the Dutch National Ballet Academy. She retired as ballet director for Scapino in 1970.

She choreographed a number of ballets including:
 De pasja en de beer
 Het papiernoodballet
 De krekel en de mier
 Dorp zonder mannen
 De tijgerprinses
 Vadertje tijd neemt even rust

Snoek also founded Assitej Netherlands, the youth theatre  and the IVKO Montessori school of arts.

In 1960, she was named an Officer in the Order of Orange-Nassau.

Snoek was married twice: first to Nicolaas Wijnberg, a dancer, in 1939 and then, in 1951, to television director .

In 2001, she died in Amsterdam at the age of 90.

The Hans Snoek Award was established by the Dutch Association of Theatre Directors.

References 

1910 births
2001 deaths
Dutch ballerinas
Dutch women choreographers
Officers of the Order of Orange-Nassau
20th-century Dutch ballet dancers